Marvin Edward Gardner (July 7, 1907 – November 17, 1955) professionally known as Eduardo de Castro, was a Filipino actor and filmmaker of American descent.

Early life
Eduardo de Castro was born Marvin Edward Gardner in Sampaloc, Manila on July 7, 1907 to William Henry Gardner, a police officer in Manila and to Ceferina De Castro. His father was an American soldier who fought in the Philippine–American War who decided to settle in the islands after the conflict and worked as police officer in 1901. Marvin's parents had six children, two whom died at infancy with two boys and two girls being the remaining children. In the 1920s, de Castro worked as a seafarer who worked in a freighter which sails to the United States before starting his acting career in the 1930s.

Career
De Castro is known for directing the 1937 film Zamboanga, which is among the first studio-type film production in the Philippines.

He was also a noted actor during the Philippines' silent film era. Among the films he starred was The Moro Pirate by Malayan Movies, the Brides of Sulu (1937) by Universal Pictures, and Andres Bonifacio by Manila Talkatone.

Later years and death
De Castro fought as a guerilla against the Imperial Japanese forces during World War II. He became a prisoner of war and was interned by the Japanese at Fort Santiago. When he was released he was in poor health. He died on November 17, 1955, at the Baguio General Hospital after suffering from a stroke while at his residence in Baguio. He was working on a script for a new film, entitled Maskara.

Personal life
De Castro was of American descent through his father. He was married to actress Rita Rica, whose real name was Florence Little, with whom he had two sons. He also had a son with Mona Lisa, another Filipino actress.

References

Filipino film directors
Filipino male silent film actors
Filipino people of American descent
Filipino prisoners of war
World War II prisoners of war held by Japan
1907 births
1955 deaths